The WIPO Journal: Analysis and Debate of Intellectual Property Issues was a peer-reviewed law review established in 2009 that was published by Sweet & Maxwell (a division of Thomson Reuters) on behalf of the World Intellectual Property Organization. Its editor-in-chief was Peter K. Yu. The WIPO Journal was discontinued at the end of 2016.

References

External links
 
 

Intellectual property law journals
Law journals
World Intellectual Property Organization
Biannual journals
Publications established in 2009
English-language journals